Hartswood Films is a British television production company founded by Beryl Vertue in 1979. They have also produced dramas such as Jekyll, as well as documentaries, and the 1990s ITV/BBC sitcom Men Behaving Badly.

In 2009, Hartswood opened a production office in Cardiff, which works alongside BBC Wales' "drama village" in Cardiff Bay. The company's first Cardiff-based production is Sherlock, co-created by Steven Moffat.

See also
Television series by Hartswood Films

References

External links
Official website

Television production companies of the United Kingdom